Tamme Hanken (May 16, 1960 – October 10, 2016) was a German horse whisperer and animals bonesetter known from the two documentary TV shows Der XXL-Ostfriese on NDR and Knochenbrecher on Tour on kabel eins, the latter of which had up to two million viewers. Born in Filsum, he also was the author of a book, Das Glück der Pferde in meinen Händen, which was published in 2001.

Tamme Hanken, who didn't have any formal chiropractic education, died in Garmisch-Partenkirchen on October 10 2016, from sudden heart failure. 2.06 m (6 ft 9 in) tall and weighing 140 kg (309 lbs), he was described as a "gentle giant" by an NDR obituary.

References

External links

 
 Official website 

1960 births
2016 deaths
German television personalities
Natural horsemanship
People from East Frisia
East Frisians